The Cheap Show is a syndicated game show parody that was broadcast in the United States in1978 and 1979. It was produced by Chris Bearde and hosted by Dick Martin, joined by hostess Wanda (Janelle Price). The show's announcer was Charlie O'Donnell.

Gameplay
Two couples competed to win cheap junk prizes and save their loved ones from slapstick "torture", which consisted of the show "taking a cheap shot at" them of some sort, with the winning couple having the chance to win real prizes at the end of the show.

Main game
There were three rounds, each consisting of one question. Two celebrities composed a panel; a seat was reserved for a third, who was always a "no-show" for some mysterious reason. For each round, the panel was asked a question. One celebrity gave the correct answer, while the other gave a bluff.

Each couple was divided, with the female at the contestants' podium, and the male trapped inside "The Punishment Pit". The first answering contestant guessed which celebrity was telling the truth. If she was correct, that couple scored one point and a cheap "prize" (such as an old bee smoker or a burned-out hair dryer), while the other player's loved one was "punished" with a pie in his face, slime or some other sloppy substance. If she was incorrect, her own loved one received his punishment and the opposing couple won the point and the "prize".

In the second round, the other couple was given the guess, and the same procedure was followed.

The first two rounds were worth one point each, and the third round was worth 20 points - this rendered the first two useless from a competitive standpoint. Whichever contestant had the most points "at the end of three rounds" advanced to the bonus round.

The Semi-Colossal Prize Sweepstakes FinaleA wheel was set up in the studio with twelve numbered spaces, each of which corresponded to a numbered envelope on a "prize wall". Each space also had a hole. To determine the prize the couple would win, a large white rat, referred to on the show as "Oscar the Wonder Rodent", was placed on the wheel while it was being spun. The hole Oscar crawled into determined the prize that was won.

At this stage in the show, no cheap "booby prizes" were awarded as they were in the main game but the winning couple won standard game show fare such as appliances or trips. In addition, the couple was asked before the wheel was spun to guess the hole they thought Oscar would crawl into; if the rat crawled into that hole, the couple won the grand prize (usually a car) in addition to the prize associated with that space.

References

External links
 

1970s American comedy game shows
1970s American satirical television series
1978 American television series debuts
1979 American television series endings
English-language television shows
First-run syndicated television programs in the United States
Television series by 20th Century Fox Television